The subfamily Dialioideae is one of the subdivisions of the plant family Fabaceae (legumes). This subfamily includes many tropical trees and shrubs. The subfamily consists of 17 genera, which are widespread throughout the tropics. It has the following clade-based definition:
The most inclusive crown clade containing Poeppigia procera C.Presland Dialium guianense (Aubl.) Sandwith, but not Cercis canadensis L., Duparquetia orchidacea Baill., or Bobgunnia fistuloides (Harms) J. H. Kirkbr. & Wiersema Members of the family also share the following morphological characteristics: the presence of cymose inflorescences, the absence of vestured pits in the xylem, and a high degree of organ loss.

Taxonomy
Dialioideae comprises the following genera:

 Androcalymma Dwyer
 Apuleia Mart.
 Baudouinia Baill.
 Dialium L.
 Dicorynia Benth.
 Distemonanthus Benth.
 Eligmocarpus Capuron
 Kalappia Kosterm.
 Koompassia Maingay ex Benth.
 Labichea Gaudich. ex DC.
 Martiodendron Gleason
 Mendoravia Capuron
 Petalostylis R.Br.
 Poeppigia C.Presl
 Storckiella Seem
 Uittienia Steenis
 Zenia Chun

Phylogenetics
Dialioideae exhibits the following phylogenetic relationships: (compare )

References 

 
Rosid subfamilies